Eleanor Jean Hill (born December 19, 1950) served as Inspector General for the United States Department of Defense under President Bill Clinton. Hill was the head of the Office of the Inspector General of the Department of Defense from 1995–1999.

Background information
Hill was born in Miami Beach, Florida. She graduated from Florida State University with her bachelor's degree in 1972, and her Juris Doctor in 1974. She was awarded the Department of Defense Distinguished Service Medal by Secretary William Perry and the Bronze Palm to the Department of Defense Medal for Distinguished Public Service by Secretary William Cohen.

American Airlines Flight 77
According to U.S. State Department cable of February 2010, released by WikiLeaks in 2011, the FBI has investigated another suspect, Mohammed al-Mansoori, who had associated with three Qatari citizens who had flown from Washington to London on the eve of the attacks, after allegedly surveying the World Trade Center and the White House. U.S. law enforcement officials said that the information about the four men was "just one of many leads that were thoroughly investigated at the time and never led to terrorism charges". An official added, however, that the three Qatari citizens have never been questioned by the FBI. Eleanor Hill, the former staff director for the congressional joint inquiry on the September 11 attacks, said the cable reinforces questions about the thoroughness of the FBI's investigation. She also said that the inquiry concluded that the hijackers had a support network that helped them in different ways. The three Qatari men were booked to fly from Los Angeles to Washington on Sept. 10, 2001, on the same plane that was hijacked and piloted into the Pentagon on the following day, but did instead fly from Los Angeles to Qatar, via London. While the cable states that Mansoori would be currently under investigation, U.S. law enforcement officials said that was no active investigation of him or of the Qatari citizens mentioned in the cable.

The Constitution Project's Guantanamo Task Force
Hill agreed to serve on The Constitution Project's Guantanamo Task Force in December 2010.

See also
 United States Department of Defense

References

External links
 
 Official DOD statement by Hill
 9/11 probe discusses Hill

1950 births
Clinton administration personnel
Constitution Project
Florida State University College of Law alumni
Living people
People from Miami Beach, Florida
Recipients of the Defense Distinguished Service Medal
United States Department of Defense officials